Adetus obliquus is a species of beetle in the family Cerambycidae. It was described by Bates in 1885.

Adetus obliquus is a type of Lamiinae, or flat-faced longhorned beetle. The type specimen used for its original description was from Neotropical Mexico. Adetus obliquus belongs to the Adetus genus within the Apomecynini tribe of Lamiinae.

References

Adetus
Beetles described in 1885